This is a list of films which have placed number one at the weekend box office in Romania during 2018.

Highest-grossing films

Venom and Aquaman became the 7th & 8th film respectively to surpass the 10 million lei mark.

See also 

 List of highest-grossing films in Romania
 List of Romanian films

References 

Romania
2018
2018 in Romania